Arise is a Swedish death metal/thrash metal-band from Alingsås. Their name is taken from the Sepultura album of the same name.

History 
Arise was founded in 1996 in Alingsås (outside of Gothenburg, Sweden) under another name, but got the name Arise in 1998 when their first demo was released. Their third demo, Abducted Intelligence, was recorded in Los Angered Recordings 2000 by Andy LaRoque, and became "demo recording of the month" in Swedish Close-Up Magazine. In 2001 the band was signed by Spinefarm Records and released their first full-length record, The Godly Work of Art. The same year, the band was nominated to the Swedish Rockbjörnen award. Their second studio album, Kings of the Cloned Generation, was released in 2003, and Spinefarm Records were bought by Universal Records during that time. Their third CD, The Beautiful New World, was recorded and released in 2005.

In December 2005 Patrik Skoglöw and Erik Ljungqvist parted ways with Daniel Bugno and L-G Jonasson due to "musical differences." They were replaced by Patrik Johansson (vocals), Sternberg (guitars), and Kaj (bass guitar).

Members

Current members
 Patrik Johansson - vocals
 Sternberg - guitar
 L-G Hakamo (formerly Jonasson) - guitar
 Kai L - bass
 Daniel Bugno - Drums

Former members
 Patrik Skoglöw - bass
 Erik Ljungqvist - vocals, guitar

Discography 
Abducted Intelligence (Demo, 2000)
The Godly Work of Art (CD, Spinefarm, 2001)
Kings of the Cloned Generation (CD, Spinefarm, 2003)
The Beautiful New World (CD, Universal, 2005)
The Reckoning (CD, Regain, 2009)

Swedish melodic death metal musical groups
Swedish thrash metal musical groups
Musical groups established in 1996
Musical quintets